Gifu 1st district (Gifu-ken dai-ikku) is a single-member electoral district for the House of Representatives, the lower house of the National Diet of Japan. It is located in central Gifu and consists of the capital city Gifu excluding the former town of Yanaizu. As of 2012, 325,090 eligible voters resided in the district.

Before the electoral reform of 1994, Western Gifu including Gifu City had formed the five-member Gifu 1st district. In the last pre-reform House of Representatives election of 1993, representatives included top-elected Iwao Matsuda for the Renewal Party, third-ranking Seiko Noda for the Liberal Democratic Party and fourth-ranking Socialist Kazō Watanabe. These three representatives were the main contestants of the new single-member 1st district in the 1996 election. Noda won and held on to the seat in subsequent elections. In 2005, she was a postal privatization rebel, but defended the seat against "assassin" candidate Yukari Satō. Noda returned to the party in 2006.

In the landslide Liberal Democratic defeat of 2009, Noda lost the seat to Democrat Masanao Shibahashi and only remained in the House via the Tōkai proportional block. In the landslide Democratic defeat of 2012, Noda regained the district at low turnout.

List of representatives

Election results

References 

Gifu Prefecture
Districts of the House of Representatives (Japan)